WRG may refer to:

 Wargames Research Group, UK publisher of games material
 Water-repellent glass for vehicles
 Waterway Recovery Group, co-ordinating  voluntary labour on UK waterways
 World Radio Geneva, later World Radio Switzerland
 Wrangell Airport, IATA airport code
 Wescom Resources Group, credit union service organisation, Pasadena, California, US